Ali Mardan, in Iran, may refer to:
 Ali Mardan, Hormozgan
 Ali Mardan, Sistan and Baluchestan
 Ali Mardan, West Azerbaijan
 Ali Mardan, Zanjan